General Hon. Henry Frederick Compton Cavendish (5 November 1789 – 5 April 1873) was a British Army officer, politician and courtier.

Early life and career
Cavendish was born in Westminster, the third son of George Cavendish, 1st Earl of Burlington and Lady Elizabeth Compton, daughter and heiress of the 7th Earl of Northampton. Cavendish was educated at Eton College and Trinity College, Cambridge. He was commissioned as a lieutenant in the 10th Dragoons in 1808 and was deployed to Spain and was wounded at the Battle of Corunna in January 1809 during the Peninsular War. In 1812 he entered Parliament for Derby, a seat which he held until 1834. In 1837, he was appointed Chief Equerry and Clerk Marshal to Queen Victoria, but resigned the post in 1841. On 2 June 1853 he was appointed colonel of The Queen's Bays, a post he held until his death. He was promoted to major-general in 1846, lieutenant-general in 1854 and full general in 1862.

Marriages and issue
He married three times:

Firstly, on 24 October 1811, he married Sarah Fawkener (27 May 1789 – November 1817), daughter of William Augustus Fawkener. They had four children:
 Elizabeth Georgiana Harriett Cavendish (12 January 1812 – 3 January 1892), married first William Bernard Harcourt, Marquis d'Harcourt, and second Lt.-Gen. James Robertson Craufurd
 Sarah Mary Compton Cavendish (27 August 1813 – 21 April 1881), married John Campbell, 2nd Earl Cawdor and had issue
 Rachel Cavendish (1815 – 31 July 1816)
 Lt.-Col. William Henry Frederick Cavendish (31 October 1817 – 11 March 1881), married Lady Emily Augusta Lambton, daughter of John Lambton, 1st Earl of Durham, and had issue

On 16 June 1819, he married secondly, Frances Susan Lambton (died 23 November 1840), daughter of William Henry Lambton and widow of Frederick Howard (killed in action at Waterloo),  and had six children:
 Francis William Henry Cavendish (6 February 1820 – 12 January 1893), married firstly, Lady Eleanor FitzGibbon, daughter of Richard FitzGibbon, 3rd Earl of Clare, and married second Ianthe Skyring, with issue by both.
 Henry Charles Lambton Cavendish (7 May 1821 – 6 October 1839)
 Rev. Charles William Cavendish (24 September 1822 – 21 December 1890), married first Felicia Susan Lygon, daughter of Henry Lygon, 4th Earl Beauchamp, without issue, married second Louisa Cockburn, natural daughter of Sir Alexander Cockburn, 12th Baronet, with issue, and married third Mary Gregg, with issue.
 George Henry Cavendish (9 January 1824 – 21 January 1889), married Emily Victorine Elizabeth Rumbold, Freifrau von Delmar, daughter of Sir William Rumbold, 3rd Baronet, and had issue
 Augustus John Cavendish (13 September 1825 – 2 October 1825)
 Caroline Fanny Cavendish (11 November 1826 – 25 January 1910), maid of honour to Queen Victoria, member of the Royal Order of Victoria and Albert, fourth class

On 28 January 1873, he married Susanna Emma Byerlie (died c. 1910), and died two months later.

References

External links 
 
 

1789 births
1873 deaths
People educated at Eton College
Alumni of Trinity College, Cambridge
2nd Dragoon Guards (Queen's Bays) officers
British Army generals
Henry
Members of the Parliament of the United Kingdom for Derby
UK MPs 1812–1818
UK MPs 1818–1820
UK MPs 1820–1826
UK MPs 1826–1830
UK MPs 1830–1831
UK MPs 1831–1832
UK MPs 1832–1835
Younger sons of earls